Excess Baggage is an Australian television reality show that first aired on the Nine Network on 30 January 2012. Due to dismal ratings it was moved to digital channel GO! on 13 February 2012. The basic premise involves eight celebrities teamed with eight contestants in a weight loss competition. It features three experts: psychologist Dr. Timothy Sharp (AKA Dr. Happy), nutritionist Dr. Joanna McMillan and personal trainer Christian Marchegiani.

The Celebrities

Teams

Locations
Each week, the teams travel to different locations across Australia.

Week 1 – The Kimberly, WA

Week 2 – The Whitsundays, QLD

Week 3 – Tasmania

Week 4 – Hunter Valley, NSW

Week 5 – Gold coast, QLD

Week 6 – Sydney, NSW

Week 7 – Kangaroo Island, SA

Week 8 – Southern Highlands, NSW

Week 9 – Melbourne, VIC

Spirit Challenges
A spirit challenge is a physical challenge which highlights the location that they are visiting. Points are usually on offer to the top teams in this challenge.

Week 1 – Spirit walk: They met Christian and teams started to walk in different directions. On their walk, teams found presents from home. Darryn gave Lisa some tough love after she started to cry. The walk made each team find out more about their team members and some of their emotional baggage. As this was the first day, no points were on offer.

Week 2 – Swimming and sailing: Teams had to start by jumping off a speed boat and swim to daydream island. There they collect their team flag and one of four keys to a sailboat. Then the four teams race along an ocean course to the finish line. The blue team were the first to get a boat, followed by orange, yellow and green. The green teams boat went off course, and the orange teams stopped completely. The blue team won and got 5 points then the yellow team getting 3 points. The green team got back on track and getting two points for coming third, with the orange team coming fourth and one point. Everyone else got no points.

Week 3 – Catch of the day

Week 4 – Wine making

Week 5 – Lifeguard training

Week 6 –  AFL extravaganza

Week 7 – Carrying history

Week 8 – Farmer's wife

Week 9 – Carrying the excess baggage

Endurance Challenges
An endurance challenge is a physical and mental challenge which is designed to test the teams' trust and communication skills. Usually all the teams can earn points.

Week 1 – The blind leading the blind: Kevin and Renee did not compete as Kevin collapsed the previous day and taken to hospital. In today's challenge, one team member had to guide the other team member through an obstacle course while blindfolded. The winning team also gets $10,000 for that teams celebrity charity. Heat 1 was Christine and Nathan, Gabby and Ben, Brant and Johnny. Brant and Johnny won and went into the final round. Heat 2 was Ajay and Matt, Kate and Sarah, Darryn and Lisa, Dipper and Lana. Kate and Sarah won heat 2. Before the final round, Lisa was upset from Darryn and was consoled by Ajay. Matt and Darryn had an argument. The final round was Brant and John and Kate and Sarah. This was a new course over rough terrain ending in jumping into a tank of water. Brant and Johnny, got $10,000 for Brant's charity and 8 points. Kate and Sarah got 6 points. Everyone else got 2 points except for Kevin and Renee who got 0.

Week 2 – Raft race: For the challenge, teams had to use wood and barrels to create a raft then paddle to a speedboat out at sea and sound a horn. All teams struggled at the start while building the raft but in the end it was the grey team Brant and John who won another endurance challenge and the maximum points available.

Week 3 – Brains and Brawn:

Week 4 – Full of hot air:

Week 5 – Race up Q1:

Week 6 – Track and field:

Week 7 – Maths Dunes:

Week 8 – Horseshoe Hill

Week 9 – Railway ramble: The teams had to solve three common clues and one personal to each team. The clues will lead them to bags filled with puzzle pieces which are scattered over the station which will they had to make a 110 piece jigsaw of the four teams. The common clues lead to bags hidden in luggage on a train, in a massive pile of coal and in barrels of ice cold water. However many dummy bags were placed to confuse the teams. Orange, purple and red were close throughout while blue were obliviously seen to struggle while solving the clues and picking up many dummy bags. Red were first to start the puzzle but a lot of arguing let the purple team get ahead and win with red getting second. Orange kept having pieces the wrong way round letting blue catch up but they came third and blue came last.

Week 9 – Super challenge: This challenge took place at Bear Island, a stronghold used during war.  The teams had to run down a jetty into the fort and to one of four stations in which they could do in any order where they would use a key or number to open a box containing parts of a decoder. When they finished they would head to a team colour station where they had to decode a message of encouragement from either one of the judges or Kate. Points were on offer. The stations were: water weight from the endurance challenge in Tasmania, Popping balloons from the endurance challenge in the Hunter valley, undoing knots from the endurance challenge in the Gold coast and milk maid from the spirit challenge in the southern highlands. The blue and purple teams got the first keys; the red team got the lead but got stuck on the water challenge which they struggled at before. The orange team fell behind early while undoing the knots. Blue and purple got back in the lead and blue won the challenge and 8 much needed points with purple not far behind putting them in the lead on points for week. Reds bickering led to orange getting third and reds getting five points.

Breakthrough Experience
A breakthrough experience is to help teams overcome some of their deepest darkest fears and help they get rid of the fear that is holding them back. They don't have to take part in these challenges.

Week 1 – Crocodiles: After meeting their psychologist, Dr Tim, teams were given the option to go swimming in a lake full of deadly Crocodiles. Though, most were hesitant at first especially Nathan but in the end all of the contestants took part.

Week 2 – Great Barrier reef: Kate and Sarah and Darryn and Lisa were chosen to go snorkeling in the great barrier reef. To get to the reef wall, they had to swim 20m through the strong currents, Kate and Sarah made it while Darryn and Lisa were not so lucky and got tired quickly. They had to go down instantly with Darryn panicking quickly but managed to reach the end with Kate and Sarah enjoying the trip.

Week 3 – Dam wall

Week 4 – Stunt planes

Week 5 – The circus

Week 6 – none: There was no breakthrough experience this week due to super sports week and concentrating on Kevin's heart attack

Week 7 – Caving

Week 8 – Skydiving

Week 9 – Helicopter crash rescue

Episodes

See also
 List of Australian television series
 Celebrity Overhaul
 The Biggest Loser
 BIG - Extreme Makeover

References

Nine Network original programming
9Go! original programming
2012 Australian television series debuts
2012 Australian television series endings
2010s Australian reality television series
English-language television shows
Television series by Fremantle (company)